The Game Factory was a Danish video game publisher operating in Europe and North America. The Game Factory was founded in 2004 and fully owned by K.E. Mathiasen A/S, with headquarters just outside Aarhus, Denmark. Its titles were distributed either by the company's own sales force in Scandinavia, their parent company K.E. Media or from their two fully owned subsidiaries in Santa Monica, California and London, England.

Their final known release was Rubik's World for the Nintendo DS and Wii on November 4, 2008. Both their American and European websites lay dormant until July 2012 when their hosting expired. Their domains eventually followed.

Games Published
Babar
Babar to the Rescue
Biker Mice From Mars
Bratz Ponyz
Bratz Ponyz 2
Care Bears: Care Quest
Cartoon Network Racing
Code Lyoko
Code Lyoko: Fall of X.A.N.A.
Code Lyoko: Quest for Infinity
Di-Gata Defenders
Franklin's Great Adventures
Franklin The Turtle: A Birthday Surprise
Garfield Bound for Home (Cancelled)
Garfield: A Tail of Two Kitties
Garfield's Nightmare
Garfield and His Nine Lives
Garfield: The Search for Pooky
Koala Brothers: Outback Adventures 
Miss Spider: Harvest Time Hop and Fly
Miss Spider: Scavenger Hunt
The Land Before Time: Into the Mysterious Beyond
Legend of the Dragon
Noddy: A Day in Toyland
Noddy and the Magic Book
Pet Alien: An Intergalactic Puzzlepalooza
Postman Pat
Postman Pat and the Greendale Rocket
Rubik's Puzzle World
Strawberry Shortcake And Her Berry Best Friends
Strawberry Shortcake: The Sweet Dreams Game
Strawberry Shortcake: Strawberryland Games
Strawberry Shortcake: The Four Seasons Cake
Strawberry Shortcake: Summertime Adventure
Strawberry Shortcake: Ice Cream Island Riding Camp
Zenses: Ocean
Zenses: Rain Forest

References

External links
 US Website (Wayback Machine) 
 European Website (Wayback Machine)

Companies based in Aarhus
Video game publishers
Danish companies established in 2004
Video game companies established in 2004
Defunct video game companies of Denmark